is a Japanese professional kickboxer, currently competing in the featherweight division of RISE, where he is the former RISE featherweight champion.

Kickboxing career

Early career
Umei faced Kuro Dash at DEEP☆KICK 35 on April 1, 2018. He won the fight by unanimous decision, with all three judges scoring the fight 30–28 in his favor. Umei next faced HΛL at NJKF 2018 west 3rd on May 27, 2018. He lost the fight by majority decision. After suffering his second professional loss, Umei was booked to face Masaki Takeuchi at The Battle Of Muay Thai 18 on July 1, 2018. He lost the fight by unanimous decision, with all three judges awarding Takeuchi a 30–29 scorecard. Umei's losing streak extended to three straight fights after suffering a first-round knockout loss, the first stoppage loss of his career, to Yosuke at DEEP☆KICK 37 on September 23, 2018.

Umei snapped his three-fight losing streak at The Battle Of Muay Thai 19 on October 14, 2018, as he stopped Kanta Suzuki in he second round. It was the first stoppage victory of his professional career. Umei faced Toranosuke at NJKF 2018 West 4th on December 16, 2018, in his sixth and final fight of the year. He won the fight by unanimous decision, with scores of 30–27, 30–27 and 30–28.

Umei was booked to face Yuichi at NJKF 2019 West 1st on February 24, 2019. He won the fight by unanimous decision, with scores of 30–28, 30–28 and 30–29. Umei next faced Seung Hyun Lee at DEEP☆KICK 39 on April 7, 2019. He won the fight by unanimous decision. After winning four fights in a row, Umei would go on to lose his next three fights. He first lost a decision to Thongsiam Kiatsongrit at DUEL 18 on May 19, 2019, after which he lost by decision to Rikiya at DEEP☆KICK 40, with his third loss being a unanimous decision loss to Seiki Ueyama at Rizin 19 - Osaka on October 12, 2019.

RISE

Early RISE career
Umei made his promotional debut with RISE against Ryoga Hirano at RISE 143 on November 14, 2020, in what was his first fight after transferring to TEAM TEPPEN. He won the fight by unanimous decision, with all three judges scoring the bout 30–29 in his favor.

Umei, at the time the #8 ranked RISE featherweight contender, was scheduled to face Naoki Yamada at RISE 147 on March 28, 2021. He won the fight by unanimous decision, with scores of 30–29, 30–28 and 30–28.

Umei was booked to face Kensei Yamakawa at RISE 151 on July 28, 2021. He won the fight by a third-round technical knockout, after the ringside physician advised the referee to stop the fight. It was his first stoppage victory since October 14, 2018.

Umei faced the sixth ranked RISE featherweight contender Shuto Miyazaki at Rise World Series 2021 Osaka 2 on November 14, 2021. He won the fight by a first-round knockout, flooring Miyazaki with a head kick at the 2:07 minute mark of the opening round.

RISE featherweight champion
His undefeated record with RISE earned Umei the opportunity to fight Ryoga Hirano for the vacant RISE Featherweight Championship at RISE 156 on March 27, 2022. The bout was a rematch of their November 14, 2020, meeting which Umei won by unanimous decision. Umei was more successful in the rematch as well, as he won the fight by majority decision. Two judges scored the fight 48–47 and 49–48 for him, while the third judge scored the fight an even 49–49 draw.

Umei made his first title defense against the third ranked RISE featherweight contender Keisuke Monguchi at RISE 161 on August 28, 2022. Umei left TEPPEN prior to the bout taking place, where he had trained since signing with RISE, and began training at Mouton gym. Umei lost the fight by unanimous decision, with two judges scoring the bout 50–46 for his opponent, while the third judge scored all five rounds for Monguchi.

Later featherweight career
Umei faced Kaito Sakaguchi at RISE 165 on February 23, 2023. He lost the fight by majority decision, with scores of 30–29, 30–29 and 29–29.

Championships and accomplishments
RISE
2022 RISE Featherweight Championship

Fight record

|-  style="background:#fbb;"
| 2023-02-23 || Loss ||align=left| Kaito Sakaguchi || RISE 165 || Tokyo, Japan ||  Decision (Majority)|| 3 || 3:00
|-
|-  style="text-align:center; background:#fbb"
| 2022-08-28 || Loss || align=left| Keisuke Monguchi || RISE 161 || Tokyo, Japan || Decision (Unanimous) || 5 ||3:00
|-
! style=background:white colspan=9 |
|-
|-  style="text-align:center; background:#cfc"
| 2022-03-27 || Win || align=left| Ryoga Hirano || RISE 156 || Tokyo, Japan || Decision (Majority) || 5 ||3:00 
|-
! style=background:white colspan=9 |
|-
|-  style="text-align:center; background:#cfc"
| 2021-11-14 || Win || align=left| Shuto Miyazaki || Rise World Series 2021 Osaka 2 || Osaka, Japan || KO (Left high kick) || 1 || 2:07 
|-
|-  style="text-align:center; background:#cfc"
| 2021-07-28 || Win || align=left| Kensei Yamakawa || RISE 151 || Tokyo, Japan || TKO (Doctor stoppage) || 2 || 0:07 
|-
|-  style="text-align:center; background:#cfc"
| 2021-03-28 || Win || align=left| Naoki Yamada || RISE 147 || Tokyo, Japan || Decision (Unanimous) || 3 || 3:00 
|-
|-  style="text-align:center; background:#cfc"
| 2020-11-14 || Win || align=left| Ryoga Hirano || RISE 143 || Tokyo, Japan || Decision (Unanimous) || 3 || 3:00 
|-
|-  style="text-align:center; background:#fbb"
| 2019-10-12 || Loss || align=left| Seiki Ueyama || Rizin 19 - Osaka || Osaka, Japan || Decision (Unanimous) || 3 || 3:00 
|-
|-  style="text-align:center; background:#fbb"
| 2019-09-15 || Loss || align=left| Rikiya || DEEP☆KICK 40 || Osaka, Japan || Decision (Unanimous) || 3 || 3:00 
|-
|-  style="text-align:center; background:#fbb"
| 2019-05-19 || Loss || align=left| Thongsiam Kiatsongrit || DUEL 18 || Kanagawa, Japan || Decision (Unanimous) || 3 || 3:00 
|-
|-  style="text-align:center; background:#cfc"
| 2019-04-07|| Win || align=left| Seung Hyun Lee || DEEP☆KICK 39 || Osaka, Japan || Decision (Unanimous) || 3 || 3:00 
|-
|-  style="text-align:center; background:#cfc"
| 2019-02-24 || Win || align=left| Yuichi || NJKF 2019 West 1st || Osaka, Japan || Decision (Unanimous) || 3 || 3:00 
|-
|-  style="text-align:center; background:#cfc"
| 2018-12-16 || Win || align=left| Toranosuke || NJKF 2018 West 4th || Osaka, Japan || Decision (Unanimous) || 3 || 3:00 
|-
|-  style="text-align:center; background:#cfc"
| 2018-10-14 || Win || align=left| Kanta Suzuki || The Battle Of Muay Thai 19 || Tokyo, Japan || TKO (Referee stoppage) || 2 || 1:02 
|-
|-  style="text-align:center; background:#fbb"
| 2018-09-23|| Loss || align=left| Yosuke || DEEP☆KICK 37 || Osaka, Japan || KO (Right straight) || 1 || 3:00 
|-
|-  style="text-align:center; background:#fbb"
| 2018-07-01 || Loss || align=left| Masaki Takeuchi || The Battle Of Muay Thai 18 || Kanagawa, Japan || Decision (Unanimous) || 3 || 3:00 
|-
|-  style="text-align:center; background:#fbb"
| 2018-05-27 || Loss || align=left| HΛL || NJKF 2018 west 3rd || Osaka, Japan || Decision (Majority) || 3 || 3:00 
|-
|-  style="text-align:center; background:#cfc"
| 2018-04-01|| Win || align=left| Kuro Dash || DEEP☆KICK 35 || Osaka, Japan || Decision (Unanimous) || 3 || 3:00 
|-
|-  style="text-align:center; background:#fbb"
| 2018-02-25 || Loss || align=left| Rikiya || Hoost Cup Kings Kyoto 4 || Kyoto, Japan || Decision (Unanimous) || 3 || 3:00 
|-
|-  style="text-align:center; background:#cfc"
| 2018-01-14 || Win || align=left| Takeshi Oda || NJKF 2018 West 1st || Osaka, Japan || Decision (Unanimous) || 3 || 3:00 
|-
|-  style="text-align:center; background:#cfc"
| 2017-12-17 || Win || align=left| Fumiya || DEEP☆KICK 34 || Osaka, Japan || Decision (Unanimous) || 3 || 3:00 
|-
|-  style="text-align:center; background:#cfc"
| 2017-10-07 || Win || align=left| Faahsang|| MUAYTHAI HIGHSPEED || Osaka, Japan || Tech. Decision (Unainmous) ||3  ||0:20 
|-
| colspan=9 | Legend:

See also
 List of male kickboxers

References

Japanese kickboxers
1998 births
Living people
Japanese male kickboxers
Japanese Muay Thai practitioners
Sportspeople from Osaka